Syntomoides is a genus of moths in the family Erebidae erected by George Hampson in 1893.

The genus is often confused with Ceryx, because in 1898 Hampson used the name Ceryx for this moth, but there was already a genus Ceryx named by Hans Daniel Johan Wallengren in 1863.

Species
Syntomoides godartii (Boisduval, 1829)
Syntomoides imaon (Cramer, [1779])

References

External links

Syntomini
Monotypic moth genera
Moths described in 1779